Beckett is an English surname. Notable people with the surname include:

Adam Beckett (born 1950), American animator, special effects artist and teacher, worked on Star Wars
Alex Beckett (born 1954), Scottish footballer
Allan Beckett (1914-2005), British civil engineer
Andy Beckett (born 1969), British journalist and historian
Ann Beckett (1927–2002), Irish pioneer of occupational therapy
Arnold Beckett (1920–2010), British pharmacist, academic, and expert on doping in sport
Barry Beckett (1943–2009), American musician
Beatrice Beckett (1905–1957), the first wife of the British statesman Anthony Eden
Bernard Beckett (born 1967), New Zealand writer of fiction for young adults
Billy Beckett (1915–1998), English footballer
Bob Beckett (born 1936), former Canadian ice hockey centre
Charles Beckett (cricketer) (born 1794), English first-class cricketer
Charles Beckett (politician) (born 1958), American politician
Charles Edward Beckett (1849–1925), brigadier-general and cavalry officer in the British Army
Chris Beckett (born 1955), English writer, social worker and academic
Christopher Beckett, 4th Baron Grimthorpe (1915–2003)
Claire Beckett (born 1978), American photographer
Clarice Beckett (1887–1935), Australian Tonalist painter
Clifford Thomason Beckett (1891-1972) British Major General
Damian Beckett or Cham (born 1979), Jamaica born rapper, singer-songwriter and actor
Dave Beckett (born 1949), of Canadian pop duo Gary and Dave
David Beckett (born 1954), English cricketer
Derry Beckett (born 1918), Irish Gaelic footballer and hurler
Douglas Beckett (born 1959), former English cricketer
Edmund Beckett, 1st Baron Grimthorpe (1816–1905)
Sir Edmund Beckett, 4th Baronet (1787–1874)
Edward Beckett, 5th Baron Grimthorpe (born 1954)
Edwin Beckett (1937–2018), Head of the British Defence Staff in Washington, D.C. 
Emma Beckett (born 1984), Australian netball player in the ANZ Championship
Emma Beckett (born 1987), Irish footballer
Ernest Beckett, 2nd Baron Grimthorpe (1856–1917)
Ernest Beckett (1869–1952), footballer
Francis Beckett (born 1945), English author, journalist, biographer, and contemporary historian
Fred Beckett (1917–1946), American jazz trombonist
Galen Beckett or Mark Anthony (writer), American author who lives and writes in Colorado
Gervase Beckett (1866–1937), born William Gervase Beckett-Denison, British banker and Conservative politician
Gwladys Beckett or Gwladys, Lady Delamere (1897–1943), the first female Mayor of Nairobi from 1938 to 1940
Harry Beckett (1935–2010), British trumpeter and flugelhorn player of Barbadian origin
Harry Beckett (actor) (1839–1880), comedian who was president of the Lambs from 1879 to 1880
Hollis Beckett (1896–1976), politician in Ontario, Canada
Isaac Beckett (1653–1719), English mezzotint engraver, one of the first practitioners of the art in the country
J. C. Beckett (1912–1996), Northern Irish historian
James Beckett (disambiguation)
Jason Beckett (born 1980), Canadian professional ice hockey defenceman
Jerry Beckett (born 1887), Irish Gaelic footballer
Joe Beckett (1892–1965), English boxer of the 1910s and 1920s 
Joe Rand Beckett (1891–1969), American veteran of World War I, lawyer, member of the Indiana Senate
Joel Beckett (born Joel Bygraves), English actor
John Beckett (disambiguation)
Josh Beckett (born 1980), Major League Baseball pitcher 
Julia Beckett (born 1986), English competitive swimmer
Justin Beckett, American entrepreneur, philanthropist and author
Kelly Beckett, English professional host, actress, musician and model
Kirsten Beckett (born 1996), South African artistic gymnast
Larry Beckett (born 1947), American poet and songwriter best known for his collaborations with Tim Buckley in the late 1960s
Laurel Beckett, American biostatistician
Lenny Beckett (born 1980), Australian rugby union player
Lez Beckett, Australian hip hop artist
Liam Beckett (born 1951), football manager and former player from Northern Ireland
Luke Beckett (born 1976), English former professional footballer
Margaret Beckett (born 1943), British Labour Party politician and Member of Parliament 
Marion H. Beckett (1886–1949), American painter
Mary Beckett (1926–2013), Irish author
Matt Beckett (born 1973), Welsh former professional cyclist
Mavis Beckett, former Australian field hockey player
Miles Beckett, co-founder of EQAL, media and technology company in 2008
Nicholas Beckett (born 1987), Jamaican international footballer
Peter Beckett (born 1948), English musician and songwriter
Ralph Beckett, 3rd Baron Grimthorpe (1891–1963)
Ray Beckett (journalist) (1903–1983), Australian journalist, newspaper editor and author
Ray Beckett (sound engineer), British sound engineer
Richard B. Beckett (1919–1983), Canadian politician
Richard Beckett (author) (1936–1987), Australian author and journalist
Richard Beckett (cricketer) (born 1772), English amateur cricketer and captain
Rick Beckett (1954–2009), American radio broadcaster
Rob Beckett (born 1986), English stand-up comedian and presenter
Robbie Beckett (born 1972), former Major League Baseball pitcher
Robbie Beckett (rugby league) (born 1974), former professional rugby league footballer
Robert Beckett (1862–1917), English-born Australian politician
Rogers Beckett (born 1977), American former football safety
Ronald G. Beckett (born 1953), American paleoanthropologist
Rowland Beckett, Australian rugby league player
Roy Beckett (1928–2008), English footballer
Sam Beckett (skateboarder) (born 1992), British professional skateboarder
Samuel Beckett (1906–1989), Irish Nobel Prize-winning writer and theatre director
Sarah Beckett (born 1999), English rugby union player
Scotty Beckett (1929–1968), American child actor who was a regular in the Our Gang series
Sheilah Beckett (1913–2013), American illustrator known for her work on the Little Golden Books series
Simon Beckett (born 1960), British journalist and author
Stephen Beckett, English actor
Tanya Beckett (born 1966), English television and radio journalist
Tavante Beckett (born 1997), American football player
Ted Beckett (1907–1978), American football player
Terence Beckett (1923–2013), British businessman
Thomas W. Naylor Beckett (1839–1906), English-born coffee and tea planter in Ceylon
Tom Beckett CBE (born 1962), British Army officer
Tony Beckett (born 1960), former Australian rules footballer
Vinton Beckett (born 1923), Jamaican former track and field athlete
W. N. T. Beckett, MVO, DSC, RN (1893–1941), Royal Navy officer in both World Wars
Wade Beckett, TV, film and digital producer
Walter Beckett (composer) (1914–1996), Irish composer
Wendy Beckett (known as Sister Wendy) (1930-2018), South African nun known for presenting art history documentaries
William Beckett (disambiguation)

Fictional characters
Beckett, a vampire in the computer role-playing game Vampire: The Masquerade – Bloodlines (2004)
Amanda Beckett, the main love interest in the film Can't Hardly Wait (1998)
Andrew Beckett, the protagonist in the film Philadelphia
Brandon Beckett, the main character in the film Sniper: Reloaded (2011)
Carson Beckett, fictional Scottish character in the Canadian-American science fiction television series Stargate Atlantis
Cutler Beckett, an antagonist in the film series Pirates of the Caribbean
Kate Beckett, a police officer on the television series Castle
Captain Maggie Beckett, on the television series Sliders
Nick Beckett, on the television series Bugs
Patrick James "PJ" Beckett, from the video game Ace Combat Zero: The Belkan War
Dr. Sam Beckett, the protagonist of the television series Quantum Leap
Sgt. Thomas Beckett, the main character in the film Sniper (1993)
Tobias Beckett, the mentor of Han Solo in Solo: A Star Wars Story (2018)
Beckett Mariner, main character on the Animated TV series Star Trek: Lower Decks
Sophia Beckett, main character on Julia Quinn’s book “An Offer From  a Gentleman.”

See also
Becket (disambiguation)
A'Beckett or à Beckett, a list of people with the surname

English-language surnames